Robert Ward Vishny (born c. 1959) is an American economist and is the Myron S. Scholes Distinguished Service Professor of Finance at the University of Chicago Booth School of Business. He was the Eric J. Gleacher Distinguished Service Professor of Finance at the University of Chicago Booth School of Business.

Education
He received his A.B. with highest distinction (economics, mathematics, and philosophy) from the University of Michigan in 1981 and Ph.D. (Economics) from Massachusetts Institute of Technology in 1985.

Academic career
He is one of the prominent representatives of the school of behavioral finance. His research activities include: market for corporate control; corporate governance around the world; privatization and the role of government in the economy; behavior of institutional investors; behavior of stock prices; the economics of corruption and rent-seeking behavior. His research papers (many of them written jointly with Andrei Shleifer, Rafael La Porta and Josef Lakonishok) are among the most often cited research works in the field of economic sciences in recent years.

He heads the NBER Program in Corporate Finance. In 1994, he founded (along with Josef Lakonishok and Andrei Shleifer) LSV Asset Management (LSV), a quantitative value equity manager providing active management for institutional investors through the application of proprietary investment models based on the principles of behavioural finance.

Selected publications

Journal articles
Vishny has authored and co-authored dozens of peer-reviewed articles including:

Vishny, Robert W, & LaPorta, R. & Lopez-de-Silanes, F. & Shleifer, A. Law and Finance, Journal of Political Economy, 1998, 106(6), pp. 1113.
Vishny, Robert W. & Shleifer, A. A Survey of Corporate Governance, Journal of Finance, 1997, 52(2), pp. 737–83.
Vishny, Robert W. & Shleifer, A. The Limits of Arbitrage, Journal of Finance, 1997, 52(1), pp. 35–55.
Vishny, Robert W. & Lakonishok, J. & Shleifer, A. Contrarian Investment, Extrapolation and Risk, Journal of Finance 1994, 49(5), pp. 1541–78.
Vishny, Robert W. & Shleifer, A. Large Shareholders and Corporate Control, Journal of Political Economy, 1986, 94(3, Part 1), pp. 461–88.

References

External links 
Robert W. Vishny - Robert W. Vishny's Site at NBER with a collection of his papers
BusinessWeek - A Businessweek article profiling Robert W. Vishny
LSV Asset Management Website
University of Chicago Booth School of Business Faculty webpage

1950s births
Year of birth missing (living people)
Living people
American economists
Behavioral economists
University of Michigan College of Literature, Science, and the Arts alumni
MIT School of Humanities, Arts, and Social Sciences alumni
University of Chicago faculty
Fellows of the American Academy of Arts and Sciences